Unstoppable, full title "Unstoppable (The Return of Natalie)" is a Swedish English language hit sung by the Swedish singer Ola Svensson and was recorded in 2010. Lyrics and music were written by Dimitri Stassos, Alexander Kronlund, Hanif Sabzevari and Svensson himself. Svensson participated in the Swedish Melodifestivalen 2010 with "Unstoppable" and finished first in the first semi-final in Örnsköldsvik on 6 February 2010. The song was qualified for the final in Stockholm. Svensson took part in the Melodifestivalen final on Saturday, 13 March 2010 at Globe Arena in Stockholm, in a bid to represent Sweden in Eurovision Song Contest 2010, held in Oslo, Norway. He came at 7th place overall with a total of 47 points, but receiving two sets of 12 points from the Serbian & Irish juries.

The song reached number one on the Swedish Singles Chart.

Charts

Weekly charts

Year-end charts

References

2010 singles
Melodifestivalen songs of 2010
Number-one singles in Sweden
Ola Svensson songs
Songs written by Alexander Kronlund
Songs written by Dimitri Stassos
2010 songs
Songs written by Ola Svensson